Paulina (minor planet designation: 278 Paulina) is a typical Main belt asteroid.

It was discovered by Johann Palisa on 16 May 1888 in Vienna.

References

External links
 
 

Background asteroids
Paulina
Paulina
S-type asteroids (SMASS)
18880516